The 1942 Dayton Flyers football team was an American football team that represented the University of Dayton as an independent during the 1942 college football season. In their 20th season under head coach Harry Baujan, the Flyers compiled an 8–2 record.

Schedule

References

Dayton
Dayton Flyers football seasons
Dayton Flyers football